Joshua William Nearney (born 7 September 1995) is an English semi-professional footballer who plays as a defender for Blyth Spartans.

Nearney can play at either right-back or centre-back and has previously played for Hartlepool United, Darlington F.C., Whitley Bay, Whitby Town and North Shields

Career
Born in Newcastle-upon-Tyne, Nearney played for the city's Wallsend Boys Club and the youth ranks of Middlesbrough before joining Hartlepool F.C.at under-16 level, where he signed his first professional contract on 16 June 2014. He was an unused substitute for the team in three matches during the 2014–15 Football League Two season, starting with their 1–2 home loss to Luton Town on 18 October 2014.
Nearney made his professional debut in the Football League Trophy first round on 1 September 2015 as a 66th-minute substitute for Michael Duckworth; Hartlepool drew 1–1 with Sheffield United at Victoria Park and lost in a penalty shootout. On 23 October, Nearney joined Northern Premier League Premier Division side Whitby Town on a one-month loan deal.

Nearney left Hartlepool in August 2017 to sign permanently for Whitley Bay. He made 33 league appearances for the Northern League side during the 2017/18 season, scoring once.

One month after submitting a transfer request in July 2018, Nearney signed  for Whitby Town.

In June 2019, Nearney joined Blyth Spartans.

Career statistics
.

References

External links
 

1995 births
Living people
Footballers from Newcastle upon Tyne
English footballers
Association football defenders
Wallsend Boys Club players
Middlesbrough F.C. players
Hartlepool United F.C. players
Darlington F.C. players
Whitby Town F.C. players
North Shields F.C. players
Blyth Spartans A.F.C. players